Koivusuo Strict Nature Reserve (Koivusuon luonnonpuisto) is a strict nature reserve located in the North Karelia region of Finland. 

This reserve has been a regular place for visits by wolverines, bears, lynxes and wolves for most of the history. 

Some of the Koitajoki trails (Tapion taival) go by the area.

See also
Scandinavian and Russian taiga

Strict nature reserves of Finland
Geography of North Karelia
Ilomantsi